The West Coast Professional Basketball League, often abbreviated to the WCBL, was an American professional men's spring basketball minor league featuring teams from the West Coast of the United States. It operated from 2007 to 2013.

Teams

Final operational clubs 
 Long Beach Rockets 
 Hollywood Beach Dawgs
 Santa Monica Jump
 West LA Advantage
 Nationwide All-Stars 
 Central Coast Surf
 Santa Barbara Breakers
 High Desert Spartans

Other teams

References

External links 
 Official website

Professional sports leagues in the United States
Basketball leagues in the United States